MPS Finance (MPSF) was founded in 2001 and is the finance sub-division of the Banca Monte dei Paschi di Siena.
MPS Finance was set up to be one of the "center of excellence" of Monte dei Paschi di Siena Group. Operating on two macro-platforms, MPS Finance performs the typical Investment Banking activity (Capital Market, Derivatives, Corporate and Government Bonds) and, at the same time, is a product factory which creates and places a whole range of financial products and services for both corporate and retail customers; there are more than 4.500.000 customers who can buy the products created by MPS Finance in the retail banks, which are more than 2000 in Italy.

In 2007 MPS Finance and MPS Banca per l'Impresa SpA were integrated in a new company for project- and corporate-financing and special lending, MPS Capital Services Banca per l'Impresa SpA (MPS CS), the Corporate and Investment Bank of Montepaschi Group, the third Italian Banking Group.

External links

Defunct banks of Italy
Former Montepaschi subsidiaries